Arthur Glenn Andrews (January 15, 1909 – September 25, 2008) was an American politician and a United States representative from Alabama.

Biography
Andrews was born in Anniston in Calhoun County in North Alabama, a son of Roger Lee Andrews and the former Beryl Elizabeth Jones. He attended public schools in Birmingham and attended John Herbert Phillips High School there. He then graduated from Mercersburg Academy, a boarding school in Mercersburg, Pennsylvania. Andrews graduated from Princeton University with an A.B. in politics in 1931 after completing an 83-page long senior thesis titled "Mr. Charles Evans Hughes. A Study of his Early Life, and Some of His Economic Opinions." He married Ethel Standish Jackson in 1937.

Career
Associated with National City Bank of New York, from 1931 to 1933, Andrews was then with International Business Machines (IBM), from 1933 to 1936. He became district manager of an Eastman Kodak subsidiary, from 1936 to 1946; and was an advertising executive, from 1946 to 1970, excluding his single term in Congress.

An Alabama Republican, Andrews represented Alabama's 4th congressional district, since mainly the 3rd district, in the United States House of Representatives. The district centers on Andrews' birthplace of Anniston.

Andrews served only in the 89th Congress from January 3, 1965, to January 3, 1967.  He and other Alabama members opposed the Voting Rights Act of 1965, which passed after the landmark African American-led March from Selma to the state capital at Montgomery. In 1966, Andrews was defeated for reelection by about the same margin that he had won in 1964. He was unseated by the Democratic State Senator Bill Nichols. Nichols received 54,515 votes (58.7 percent) to Andrews' 38,402 (41.3 percent).

For a time, Andrews chaired the Alabama Fourth Congressional District Republican Executive Committee. He sought to return to Congress in the 1970 general election, when Wallace ran unopposed for a second term as governor. He was overwhelmingly defeated by Nichols, who won 77,701 votes (83.7 percent) to Andrews' 13,217 (14.2 percent). President Richard Nixon appointed Andrews a trustee in bankruptcy court, a position which he held from 1973 to 1985.

Death
Andrews died in White Plains, Calhoun County, Alabama, on September 25, 2008 (age 99 years, 254 days). He was cremated, and his ashes are interred at Grace Episcopal Church Columbarium, in Anniston, Alabama.  Andrews became the oldest former member on November 10, 2007, with the death of former U.S. Representative Augustus Hawkins, a California Democrat.  At his death the oldest living former member of the United States Congress. Upon Andrews' death, William H. Avery, the Republican governor of Kansas from 1965 to 1967, became the oldest living former member of Congress.

References

External links

1909 births
2008 deaths
American advertising executives
Businesspeople from Birmingham, Alabama
Citigroup employees
IBM employees
Mercersburg Academy alumni
Politicians from Birmingham, Alabama
Politicians from Anniston, Alabama
Princeton University alumni
Republican Party members of the United States House of Representatives from Alabama
20th-century American politicians
20th-century American businesspeople